Frank Sandås is a Norwegian sport shooter who won the IPSC Nordic Rifle Championship (2006), IPSC Nordic Handgun Championship (2012) and the IPSC Norwegian Tournament Championship (2012).

References 
 DSSN Hall of Fame
 TriggerFreeze.com - IPSC Rifle Norway

IPSC shooters
Norwegian male sport shooters
Living people
Year of birth missing (living people)